Stephen Forde (born 1961) is a Church of Ireland clergyman, and the Dean of Belfast Cathedral.

Education
He was born in Banbridge and educated at Campbell College. He studied at the University of Edinburgh and Trinity College, Dublin.

Ordained ministry
Forde was ordained in the Church of Ireland as a deacon in 1986 and as a priest in 1987. After a curacy at St Mary, Crumlin Road, he was chaplain to Samuel Poyntz, the then Bishop of Connor; and also chaplain of Queen's University Belfast (QUB) from 1989 until 1995. He was the incumbent at Booterstown from 1995 to 1999, then Larne.

In 2006, Forde was appointed Archdeacon of Dalriada. In October 2017, it was announced that he would be the next Dean of St Anne's Cathedral, Belfast. He was installed as the 14th Dean of Belfast during a service on 4 February 2018.

References

1961 births
People from Banbridge
Living people
Archdeacons of Dalriada
People educated at Campbell College
Alumni of Queen's University Belfast
Alumni of Trinity College Dublin
Deans of Belfast